The NZSA Peter & Dianne Beatson Fellowship (known informally as the Foxton Fellowship) is an annual literary fellowship in New Zealand established by Peter and Dianne Beatson in 2001.

History and conditions
The fellowship was set up by Peter and Dianne Beatson in 2001 as a way of supporting New Zealand writers and writing, and has previously included the option of a month's residency at the Beatsons’ holiday house at Foxton Beach.

It is open to writers of fiction, non-fiction, poetry and drama. Applicants must be members of the New Zealand Society of Authors (NZSA) and need to show that they are working on a new project which has a high level of literary merit and national significance. The successful applicant receives a stipend of $10,000.

The fellowship has also been known as the Foxton Fellowship or the Beatson Fellowship. The first recipients were Janice Marriott ( 2001–2002), Chris Else (2002–2003), Marilyn Duckworth (2003–2004), Sue McCauley (2004–2005), Jackie Davis (2005–2006), Paddy Richardson (2006–2007), Norman Bilbrough (2007–2008), Jo Randerson (2008–2009) and Glenn Colquhoun (2009–2010).

The benefactors
Peter Beatson was born in Christchurch, New Zealand, in 1942. After studying at the University of Canterbury, he was awarded doctorates in English literature from Cambridge University (1974) and in sociology from the University of Provence (1978) and lectured in sociology at Massey University, Palmerston North, from 1978 to 2006. In recognition of his contribution to the literary arts sector in New Zealand, he was elected the President of Honour of the New Zealand Society of Authors in 2004–2005.

Dianne Beatson was a teacher and author. She died in November 2013. Sunset at the Estuary was published as a tribute to her in 2015.

Recipients since 2010
2010–2011 Carl Nixon
2011–2012 Catherine Chidgey
2012–2013 Mandy Hager
2013–2104 Diane Brown
2014–2105 Emma Neale
2015–2016 Michael Harlow
2016–2017 Tina Makereti
2017–2018 Jillian Sullivan
2018–2019 Sue Wootton
2019–2020 Frankie McMillan
2020-2021 Siobhan Harvey
2021-2022 Whiti Hereaka

References

New Zealand literary awards
2001 establishments in New Zealand
Foxton, New Zealand